Hans Zurbriggen (22 February 1920 – 23 July 1950) was a Swiss ski jumper. He competed in the individual event at the 1948 Winter Olympics.

References

External links
 

1920 births
1950 deaths
Swiss male ski jumpers
Olympic ski jumpers of Switzerland
Ski jumpers at the 1948 Winter Olympics
Sportspeople from Valais